Fissistigma cupreonitens is a species of plant in the Annonaceae family. It is endemic to China.

References

Annonaceae
Endemic flora of China
Endangered flora of Asia
Taxonomy articles created by Polbot